Wellington is a city in and the county seat of Sumner County, Kansas, United States.  As of the 2020 census, the population of the city was 7,715.

History

19th century

Wellington was platted in 1871 and named for the Duke of Wellington. It was designated as the Sumner County seat in 1872, winning out over Sumner City according to the Wellington library.  Cattle herders coming up the Chisholm Trail helped to build the early town's economy.

The first post office in Wellington was established in July 1871.

In 1887, the Chicago, Kansas and Nebraska Railway built a north–south branch line from Herington through Wellington to Caldwell.  Creditors foreclosed on it 1891 and the railroad was taken over by Chicago, Rock Island and Pacific Railroad, which shut down in 1980 and reorganized as Oklahoma, Kansas and Texas Railroad, merged in 1988 with Missouri Pacific Railroad, merged in 1997 with Union Pacific Railroad.  Most locals still refer to this railroad as the "Rock Island".

On May 27, 1892, an estimated F4 tornado struck Wellington, destroying 100 homes and 30 businesses, and killing 12 people in town.

Geography
Wellington is located at  (37.265777, -97.398001), at an elevation of 1227 feet.

Climate
The climate in this area is characterized by hot, humid summers and generally mild to cool winters.  According to the Köppen Climate Classification system, Wellington has a humid subtropical climate, abbreviated "Cfa" on climate maps.

Demographics

2010 census
As of the 2010 United States Census, there were 8,172 people, 3,246 households, and 2,105 families living in the city. The racial makeup of the city was 91.0% White, 1.7% African American, 1.5% Native American, 0.3% Asian, 2.0% from other races, and 3.5% from two or more races. Hispanic or Latino of any race were 8.3% of the population.

There were 3,246 households, of which 33.2% had children under the age of 18 living with them, 47.0% were married couples living together, 12.1% had a female householder with no husband present, 5.7% had a male householder with no wife present, and 35.2% were non-families. 30.6% of all households were made up of individuals, and 14% had someone living alone who was 65 years of age or older. The average household size was 2.44 and the average family size was 3.03.

The median age in the city was 37.7 years. 27.2% of residents were under the age of 18; 7.3% were between the ages of 18 and 24; 23.2% were from 25 to 44; 26.1% were from 45 to 64; and 16.1% were 65 years of age or older. The gender makeup of the city was 48.7% male and 51.3% female.

2000 census
As of the 2000 United States Census, there were 8,647 people, 3,422 households, and 2,306 families living in the city. The racial makeup of the city was 92.36% White, 1.71% African American, 1.24% Native American, 0.29% Asian, 0.10% Pacific Islander, 2.58% from other races, and 1.72% from two or more races. Hispanic or Latino of any race were 7.26% of the population.

There were 3,422 households, out of which 32.9% had children under the age of 18 living with them, 53.1% were married couples living together, 9.9% had a female householder with no husband present, and 32.6% were non-families. 29.4% of all households were made up of individuals, and 14.4% had someone living alone who was 65 years of age or older. The average household size was 2.47 and the average family size was 3.05.

In the city, the population was spread out, with 27.6% under the age of 18, 9.0% from 18 to 24, 25.6% from 25 to 44, 20.9% from 45 to 64, and 16.9% who were 65 years of age or older. The median age was 37 years. For every 100 females, there were 93.6 males. For every 100 females age 18 and over, there were 90.7 males.

The median income for a household in the city was $35,410, and the median income for a family was $43,493. Males had a median income of $34,368 versus $22,254 for females. The per capita income for the city was $16,790. About 8.9% of families and 11.5% of the population were below the poverty line, including 13.6% of those under age 18 and 7.3% of those age 65 or over.

Economy

The surrounding region produced large amounts of winter wheat which was the mainstay of the local economy .  Railroads, petroleum, and aircraft parts manufacturing are other important businesses.

Arts and culture

Area events
 Aviation Fest
 Kansas Wheat Festival

Area attractions
 Downtown Wellington Historic District
 Wellington Carnegie Library
 H.F. Smith House
 Chisholm Trail Museum
 Wellington Lake

Education

The community is served by Wellington USD 353 public school district.

Media
Wellington is also home to the Wellington Daily News.

Notable people

 Ernie Barrett, Professional basketball player for the Boston Celtics (first round 7th pick in 1951 NBA draft). Also nicknamed "Mr. K-State" for his love of Kansas State and his performance as a player at Kansas State. He has a statue standing outside of Bramlage Coliseum, as well as his jersey retired. Barrett was the point guard for Wellington during their only basketball state championship in 1947.
 Ara Bartlett, lawyer and judge. Second Chief Justice of the Supreme Court of the Dakota Territory. 
 Ryleigh Buck, softball player on the United States women's national baseball team at the 2015 Pan American games in Toronto, Canada they won gold. Buck currently plays softball at Wichita State University. She graduated from Wellington in 2016.
 David Carradine, American actor and film director lived in Wellington for around a year in the early 1980s while filming his movie, Americana (film) in Drury, Kansas. While in Wellington, Carradine lived with his brother Robert Carradine and Dan Haggerty, also known as Grizzly Adams. Haggerty appeared in the film 
 Arthur S. Champeny, United States Army officer
 Mardie Cornejo, Major League Baseball player for the New York Mets. 
 Nate Cornejo, Major League Baseball player for the Detroit Tigers. First round draft pick.
 Mabel Cory Costigan, child labor law advocate, served on advisory council of the National Child Labor Committee
 Walter Chrysler, founder of the Chrysler Corporation. Chrysler briefly moved to Wellington in 1897 to join the railroad, nearly thirty years before starting the Chrysler Corporation.
 Todd Diacon, president of Kent State University.
 Maurice Elder, 26th pick in the 1937 NFL Draft by the Boston Redskins, football coach at Colorado State University–Pueblo from 1946 to 1951. Maternal grandfather of pro football quarterback, Jeff Garcia. 
 Phil Ferguson, politician, US Representative from the state of Oklahoma from 1935 to 1941. 
 Neil Frank, meteorologist and former director of the National Hurricane Center
 Gary Freeman (sculptor), artist and professor emeritus at Indiana University-Purdue University Indianapolis. 
 Betty Glamann, born in Wellington. She was a harpist, who played with the likes of Spike Jones and Duke Ellington. 
 Loren Hibbs, current Director of Baseball Operations at Wichita State University former head baseball coach for Charlotte baseball, in Charlotte, NC. Currently has over 801 career victories from 1993 to 2019.
 Francis Heydt, Four time NCAA Champion swimmer and University it Michigan Hall of Honor class of 1988.
 B. Everett Jordan, United States Senator from North Carolina.
 Henry P. Larrabee, 49er, and rancher. Notorious for his treatment of Native Americans.
 Gordon William Lillie, nicknamed Pawnee Bill, a showman who specialized in Wild West shows and is most known for his partnership with Buffalo Bill. He moved to Wellington when he was young from Illinois and was raised here.
 Joseph E. Maddy, pioneering music educator and founder of the Interlochen Arts Camp
 Chuck Miller, pop and jazz musician
 Minnie Minnich, American politician in the Kansas House of Representatives. 
 Jack Mitchell, All-American quarterback at the University of Oklahoma, head football coach at Wichita State University, University of Arkansas and the University of Kansas. Publisher of Wellington Daily News
 Kate Pelham Newcomb, physician
 John Travis Nixon, newspaper publisher in Monroe and Crowley, Louisiana; formerly resided in Wellington in early 1880s
 David L. Payne, American soldier and pioneer
 Bill Rhiley, American politician in the Kansas House of Representatives.
 Montie Rissell, serial killer, born in Wellington. Murdered five people and raped 12 more in Virginia from 1976 to 1977
 Fred Roberts (American football coach), head football coach at the University of Oklahoma.
 Mary Bell Smith (1818-1894), farmer, educator, social reformer, and writer
 Karl Spear, head football coach and athletic director at Baker University.
 Vince Wetta, American politician, Kansas House of Representatives. Wetta has resided in Wellington since 1966.
 Kent Whealy, activist and journalist, co-founder of the Seed Savers Exchange.
 Ed Willett, Major League Baseball player.
 Logan Wright, Former president of the American Psychological Association.

References

Further reading

External links

 City of Wellington
 Wellington - Directory of Public Officials
 Wellington city map, KDOT

Cities in Sumner County, Kansas
Cities in Kansas
County seats in Kansas
Wichita, KS Metropolitan Statistical Area
1871 establishments in Kansas
Populated places established in 1871